To whom will God send is a 1994 Russian comedy film directed by Vladimir Zaykin.

Plot 
Starting 1970s. Marina Rodionova gives birth to a child from a donor. Grown up son Andrei she tells the legend of the deceased father. It takes many years. Son of a student accidentally discovers that his father is a professor Hlyuzdin who teaches at his institute. Andrew's friend can not get from Ladder strict professor and then Andrew decides to introduce his father and mother.

Cast 

 Larisa Udovichenko as Marina Rodionova
 Stanislav Sadalsky as Pavel Hlyuzdin
 Maria Lobachova as Nastya Sukonnikova
 Leonid Torkeani  as  Andrei 
 Sergey Migitsko as  Arkady
Igor Dmitriev as Rodion Arkadievich Zosimovsky
 Vladimir Zaykin   as episode
Yevgeni Lebedev  as episode
 Andrei Chumanov  as episode
 Kira Kreylis-Petrova as Hlyuzdin's mother 
 Konstantin Khabensky as pedestrian with glasses

Prizes and awards 
  White Sun of the Adler 96:  Best Film competition, the prize for Best Actor (Sadalsky) 
 Open Grand Prix Festival of Selb, Germany
 Prize  The Best Debut  Comedy Festival, Krasnodar
 Prize  Best Actor  festival  Constellation  95

References

External links
 IMDb
 KinoPoisk

1994 films
Russian comedy films
Lenfilm films
1994 comedy films